Anvillea is a genus of flowering plants in the daisy family.

 Species
 Anvillea garcinii (Burm.f.) DC. - North Africa, Middle East, Arabian Peninsula
 Anvillea platycarpa (Maire) Anderb. - Morocco, Western Sahara

References

External links

Asteraceae genera
Inuleae